Dorenfeldt is a surname. Notable people with the surname include:

Lauritz Dorenfeldt Jenssen (1801–1859), Norwegian businessperson
Lauritz Jenssen Dorenfeldt (1863–1932), Norwegian engineer
Lauritz Jenssen Dorenfeldt (1909–1997), Norwegian jurist